Petra Wimbersky (born 9 November 1982) is a former German football striker. After four years at FFC Frankfurt she returned to her former club Bayern Munich. She also plays for the German national team.

She ended her career in 2012.

Honours

Germany
UEFA Women's Championship: Winner 2005

References

External links
DFB profile

1982 births
Living people
German women's footballers
Germany women's international footballers
2007 FIFA Women's World Cup players
Footballers at the 2004 Summer Olympics
Olympic bronze medalists for Germany
Footballers from Munich
FC Bayern Munich (women) players
1. FFC Turbine Potsdam players
1. FFC Frankfurt players
Olympic medalists in football
Medalists at the 2004 Summer Olympics
FIFA Women's World Cup-winning players
Women's association football forwards
Olympic footballers of Germany
UEFA Women's Championship-winning players